The World Group was the highest level of Davis Cup competition in 1997. The first-round losers went into the Davis Cup World Group Qualifying Round, and the winners progressed to the quarterfinals and were guaranteed a World Group spot for 1998.

France were the defending champions, but were eliminated in the first round.

Sweden won the title, defeating the United States in the final, 5–0. The final was held at the Scandinavium in Gothenburg, Sweden, from 28 to 30 November. It was the Swedish team's 6th Davis Cup title overall.

Participating teams

Draw

First round

Brazil vs. United States

Romania vs. Netherlands

Australia vs. France

Czech Republic vs. India

Italy vs. Mexico

Spain vs. Germany

South Africa vs. Russia

Sweden vs. Switzerland

Quarterfinals

United States vs. Netherlands

Australia vs. Czech Republic

Italy vs. Spain

Sweden vs. South Africa

Semifinals

United States vs. Australia

Sweden vs. Italy

Final

Sweden vs. United States

References

External links
Davis Cup official website

World Group
Davis Cup World Group
Davis Cup